The following is a list of capitals in Malaysia. It mainly describes the capitals of the states, districts, as well as the national capitals of Malaysia.

National capital
The national capital of Malaysia is Kuala Lumpur. It remains the primary cultural, business and financial centre in Malaysia. The Parliament of Malaysia and the official residence of the King are also located in Kuala Lumpur. In 2001, the seat of government was moved from Kuala Lumpur to the planned city of Putrajaya which from then on served as the federal administrative centre, sometimes referred to as the administrative capital. Both these cities, together with Labuan, have special status as Federal Territories of Malaysia.

Article 154(1) of the Federal Constitution states that unless been declared otherwise by the Parliament, Kuala Lumpur shall remain as the federal capital.

State capitals
Each state in Malaysia has its own state capital, where the state administration is carried out by each respective state government that is formed after winning the elections. The three Federal Territories of Malaysia –  Kuala Lumpur, Labuan and Putrajaya – are headed by the Yang di-Pertuan Agong and administered by the Department of the Federal Territories under the Prime Minister's  Department.

All the states in Peninsular Malaysia except for Malacca, Penang, are constitutional monarchies. The two and Sabah and Sarawak are non-monarchical states, which are headed by a Yang di-Pertua Negeri (Governors). Thus, those states with constitutional monarchies have royal capitals or seats where the palace or official residences of the monarchs are situated. These capitals are sometimes different from the state's administrative capitals. The Yang di-Pertuan Agong resides in Kuala Lumpur.

District capitals

See also
 List of cities and towns in Malaysia by population

References 

Government of Malaysia
 

Capitals in Malaysia
 
Malaysia
Malaysia